The Shuttleworth Foundation was established in January 2001 by South African entrepreneur Mark Shuttleworth as an experiment with the purpose of providing funding for people engaged in social change. While there have been various iterations of the foundation, its structure and how it invests in social innovation, the current model employs a fellowship model where fellows are given funding commensurate with their experience to match a year's salary, allowing them to spend that year developing a particular idea.

Notable past and present fellows include Marcin Jakubowski (who develops the Open Source Ecology project), Rufus Pollock (co-founder of the Open Knowledge Foundation) and Mark Surman (now Executive Director of Mozilla Foundation.)

Funding model 
The Foundation provides funding for people who have an unproven idea in the form of a 'salary', travel and office expenses. For every dollar invested by the Fellow in a project, the Foundation will put in ten or more, allowing the Fellow to own all Intellectual Property and processes once the active fellowship has ceased.

Projects 
 Freedom Toaster
 Kusasa
 SchoolTool, student information system
 Serval Project, for smart phone ad hoc networks
 strong encryption for Twitter
 tuXlabs
 FarmBot

References

External links 
Shuttleworth Foundation website

Information and communication technologies in Africa
Youth organisations based in South Africa